Brownsburg may refer to:

Canada
 Brownsburg, Quebec, a former municipality now part of Brownsburg-Chatham

United States
 Brownsburg, Indiana
 Brownsburg, Pennsylvania, see Brownsburg Village Historic District
 Brownsburg, Virginia
 Brownsburg, West Virginia